The Jerusalem corridor (Prozdor Yerushalayim) is a geographical district of hundreds of thousands of dunams between Jerusalem and the Shephelah in Israel. Its northern border is the old road to Jerusalem; its southern border, the Elah Valley; and its western border, Sha'ar HaGai/Bab el-Wad and the road to Beit Shemesh. The largest towns in the Jerusalem corridor are Beit Shemesh, Mevasseret Zion, Abu Ghosh, Tzur Hadassah and Kiryat Ye'arim.

History

Historically, Arab villagers practised terrace farming in the narrow valleys and wadis of the area.

During the 1947-48 war, the Jerusalem corridor was the only route for bringing supplies to besieged Jerusalem. In the Battle of Latrun, Jewish forces attempted to capture the former British police fort at Latrun, where Jordanian forces were stationed. The so-called Burma Road was built as an alternative. In October 1948, Israeli troops brought the area under their control during Operation Ha-Har. The Arab inhabitants fled their villages during the war.

As of 1949, the mountainous, rocky region of the corridor was bare of trees. In the first decade of the State of Israel, a total of 35 agricultural settlements were established in the Jerusalem corridor by new immigrants from Yemen, Kurdistan, North Africa, Romania and Hungary. The JNF employed many of the newcomers in afforestation and land reclamation. Since then it has become one of the largest afforested regions in the country.

Modern roads and railway in the area
Today, in addition to the Jerusalem – Tel Aviv highway (Highway 1), a number of additional routes lead to Jerusalem; route 443 covers the northern part of the corridor. Route 395 leads from Ein Kerem to the coast, via Ramat Raziel and Bet Shemesh, and continues south. Route 386 leads to the Ella Valley, via Bar Giora and Tzur Hadassa. A railway line is active in the corridor, next to the Sorek Stream, which is part of the historical Jaffa–Jerusalem railway.

References

Regions of Israel
Geography of Jerusalem District
Geopolitical corridors